Agave longiflora (synonym Manfreda longiflora) is a species of flowering plant in the family Asparagaceae that is native to the Lower Rio Grande Valley of Texas in the United States and northern Tamaulipas in Mexico. Common names include amole de río, longflower tuberose, and Runyon's huaco.  The type specimens were sent by botanist and photographer Robert Runyon (1881–1968) to the New York Botanical Garden in 1921.  Consequently, the species was initially placed in a monotypic genus named in his honour, Runyonia, by Joseph Nelson Rose. The species has been placed in the genus Manfreda, now absorbed into Agave. A. longiflora is a rhizomatous perennial with 3–7 prostrate leaves in a basal rosette. It inhabits hills, terraces and slopes in the semi-arid Tamaulipan mezquital.

References

longiflora
Flora of Tamaulipas
Flora of the Rio Grande valleys
Flora of the Chihuahuan Desert
Plants described in 1975
Endangered flora of the United States